The 2012 Canadian Soccer League season (known as the Givova Canadian Soccer League for sponsorship reasons) was the 15th since its establishment where a total of 28 teams from Ontario and Quebec took part in the league. The season began on 5 May 2012, and concluded on 27 October 2012. Toronto Croatia defended their championship in a 1–0 victory over the Montreal Impact Academy in the CSL Championship final at Centennial Park Stadium in Toronto. Montreal became the second Quebec club after Trois-Rivières Attak to reach the final, while Toronto added more silverware to their cabinet by winning the double during the regular season. In the Second Division SC Toronto B won their first Second Division championship, and TFC Academy II secured the regular season title.

The league grew to a record amount of 16 first division teams with Kingston, Waterloo, and Niagara being promoted to the first division. A number of CSL teams began operating their academy teams in the Canadian Academy of Futbol (CAF). During the past three seasons the league's player developmental system made further advances with 27 players moving overseas, and 42 being selected to the Canada national team program. While six TFC Academy players were signed by first team Toronto FC of the Major League Soccer.

Rogers TV continued broadcasting matches for the CSL, while CogecoTV provided coverage to the Niagara and Kingston regions. The league reintroduced their television program This Week in the CSL with producer Alex Bastyovanszky returning to host the program with Rogers TV broadcasting the program.

Changes from 2011 
Each team will play an unbalanced schedule of 22 games for the 2012 season.

Teams 
A total of 16 teams will contest the league, including 13 from the 2011 season and three expansion teams.
The league will feature three expansion teams which started play in last years second division, Kingston FC which joined the CSL as Prospect FC, Niagara United, and SC Waterloo Region formerly known as KW United FC. Capital City F.C. will not return for the 2012 season after failing to renew their league membership.

Results

Positions by round

Standings

Tiebreak rules
 Total wins in regular season games.
 Head-to-head record based on total points in league games.
 Goal difference in regular season games.
 Goals scored in regular season games.

Goal scorers
Statistics .

Playoffs

Bracket
The top 8 teams will qualify for the one-game quarter final, and a one-game semi-final leading to the championship game to be played on 27 October at Centennial Park Stadium.

Quarterfinals

Semifinals

Givova CSL Championship

CSL Executive Committee and Staff 
The 2012 CSL Executive Committee.

Individual awards 

The annual CSL awards were held at the Mississauga Convention Centre in Mississauga, Ontario on 25 November 2012. The league chose Marin Vucemilovic-Grgic as its MVP, a former 2. HNL player who spearheaded Toronto Croatia's to the best offensive record. Toronto also managed to produce the best defensive record throughout the season, and as a result Antonio Ilic was named the Goalkeeper of the Year. Another Croatian import who played with SC Waterloo Drazen Vukovic received the Golden Boot. While Montreal Impact Academy alumni Maxim Tissot was given the Defender, who later was promoted to the Montreal Impact senior team.

SC Toronto developed Jonathan Osorio into the Rookie of the Year, who later was signed by Toronto FC in the MLS. After leading the Windsor Stars to their first postseason appearance since the 2007 season Steve Vagnini was voted the Coach of the Year. Ryan Gauss was honored with the Harry Paul Gauss award for his commitment and allegiance to the league. For the second straight season David Barrie was selected by the CSL Referee Committee as the Referee of the Year. TFC Academy were given their third Fair Play and Respect award for their solid discipline on the field of play.

Robin Glover and Enio Perruzza were acknowledged by the league for their continual years of service, and were given the Media and Broadcaster awards. Glover received the Media award for his years of loyalty in producing match reports since the 1995 CNSL season. While Perruzza was given the Broadcaster award for announcing over 3,000 matches throughout a span of 26 years.

Second Division 

The CSL fielded 12 teams in its Second Division, all reserve teams of players mostly under 23 years of age. With emphasis on developing the younger players, the league rule allows for a maximum three players and the goalkeeper to be over 23. The teams played a 16-game schedule. The division decreased its membership to 12 teams after Kingston FC, Niagara United, and SC Waterloo were promoted to the First Division, but retained their reserves squad in the Second Division. London City, and Toronto Croatia also withdrew their reserve teams with Windsor Stars entering a reserve squad.

Standings

Second Division Playoffs

Quarterfinals

Semifinals

Final

Individual awards

Outside League Matches

References

External links
 CSL official website

2012
Canadian Soccer League
Canadian Soccer League